Paopi 11 - Coptic Calendar - Paopi 13

The twelfth day of the Coptic month of Paopi, the second month of the Coptic year. On a common year, this day corresponds to October 9, of the Julian Calendar, and October 22, of the Gregorian Calendar. This day falls in the Coptic season of Peret, the season of emergence.

Commemorations

Feasts 

 Monthly commemoration of Archangel Michael

Saints 

 The martyrdom of Saint Matthew the Evangelist
 The departure of Pope Demetrius I, the Vinedresser, the twelfth Patriarch of the See of Saint Mark

References 

Days of the Coptic calendar